A portable DVD player is a mobile, battery powered DVD player in the format of a mobile device. Many recent players play files from USB flash drives and SD cards.

History
Portable DVD players were created in order to aid the ability to watch DVDs away from home. They were created in 1998, first introduced by Panasonic. They are practical for "on the go" use, and many perform secondary functions such as playing music from audio CDs and displaying images from digital cameras or camcorders.

Impact
The popularity of low-cost battery powered portable DVD players in North Korea allows families to watch Chinese and South Korean programs on SD cards and USB flash drives. North Korean defectors run activist groups, like Fighters for a Free North Korea that smuggle DVDs and SD cards into the country "to introduce North Koreans to the rest of the world". Activist groups planned to distribute DVD copies of The Interview via balloon drops. The balloon drop was postponed after the North Korean government referred to the plan as a de facto "declaration of war."

Design
Most PDPs use TFT LCD screens, some using LED backlighting. Some have articulating screens that rotate 180 degrees & fold flat. Portable DVD players generally have connections for additional screens and a car lighter plug.

Some PDPs now have iPod docks, USB and SD Card slots built in.  Some can play videos in other formats such as MP4, DivX, either from CDs, flash memory cards or USB external hard disks. Also some DVD players include a USB video recorder.

Some DVD players have Wifi access, helping to play Internet TV, and some have Bluetooth, allowing users to play content from or to other devices like smartphones.

Previous models of portable DVD players had AV inputs for external game consoles; now some selected models have built-in emulators for internal game console action.

Many portable DVD players can display more than just video DVDs. Many can also play other video formats, image formats and music formats, and may even include a built-in digital TV tuner so one can watch digital TV on the go.

Price range
Prices of portable DVD players vary, usually retailing for about US$40–300. When first released, portable DVD players would retail at over $1,000 and were only manufactured in Japan. Price drops in 2015 have led to some devices being retailed for as little as $40.

See also
 Digital television
 In car entertainment
 Handheld television
 Notel
 Television set
 Video Walkman

References

External links
 Portable DVD Players info from CNet

DVD Player
Consumer electronics
DVD
Japanese inventions
Video hardware
1998 introductions